John R. Lindgren (February 20, 1855 – April 29, 1915) was an American banking executive.

Biography
John Richard Lindgren was born in Chicago, Illinois, the only son of Charles Magnus Lindgren, a Swedish-born ship captain and vessel-owner of Chicago. With Helge Alexander Haugan, Lindgren established the banking firm of Haugan & Lindgren in 1879. During 1889, Lindgren was the principal founder of the Bank of Galesburg in Galesburg, Illinois. In 1891, he was elected cashier and vice president of the State Bank of Chicago.

For many years Lindgren held a membership in the Chicago Board of Trade, as well as the Chicago Stock Exchange. Lindgren was appointed Vice Consul of Sweden and Norway at Chicago in 1893. He was subsequently awarded the Order of Vasa by King Oscar II. Lindgren was a member of the Swedish-American Historic Society and a trustee of Northwestern University. Lindgren Hall, a student residence hall on the Evanston campus of Northwestern University, was named in honor of Lindgren.

References

External links
"Northwestern University, Evanston Campus"

1855 births
1915 deaths
American people of Swedish descent
American bankers
Businesspeople from Evanston, Illinois
Businesspeople from Chicago
Recipients of the Order of Vasa
19th-century American businesspeople